Robert Bach (7 December 1901 – 10 June 1976) was a German politician of the Social Democratic Party (SPD) and former member of the German Bundestag.

Life 
Bach had been a member of the SPD since 1920. Bach was a member of the German Bundestag from 27 October 1959, when he succeeded Rudolf Recktenwald as a member of parliament, until 1961. He entered the parliament via the state list of the SPD in Saarland.

Literature

References

1901 births
1976 deaths
Members of the Bundestag for Saarland
Members of the Bundestag 1957–1961
Members of the Bundestag for the Social Democratic Party of Germany